Makari is a village in Bombali District, Northern Province, of Sierra Leone, West Africa. It was the former headquarters of the Makari Gbanti chiefdom.

Notes

Villages in Sierra Leone
Northern Province, Sierra Leone